Þórir Hergeirsson (born 27 April 1964) is an Icelandic handball coach and former player. He is currently the head coach of the Norwegian women's national team.

Early life
Þórir was born and raised in Selfoss.

Playing career
Þórir played for Selfoss handball team until 1986. He later played for a short while in Norway before fully focusing on his coaching career.

Coaching career
Þórir's first coaching experience was with Selfoss junior teams. Shortly after moving to Oslo in 1986 to further his education he was hired as the head coach of Elverum men's team. He later coached at Gjerpen Håndball and Nærbø IL.

Þórir has been part of the Norway national coaching team since 2001, and took over as head coach in April 2009, succeeding former head coach Marit Breivik. 

In August 2016, he won Bronze with Norway at the 2016 Summer Olympics. In December 2016, he guided the team to gold at the 2016 European Women's Handball Championship despite losing his mother the day before the tournament started.

Achievements
Olympic Games
2012 – 1st
2016 – 3rd
2020 – 3rd

World Championship
2009 – 3rd
2011 – 1st
2013 – 5th
2015 –  1st
2017 – 2nd
2019 – 4th
2021 – 1st

European Championship
2010 – 1st
2012 – 2nd
2014 – 1st
2016 – 1st
2018 – 5th
2020 – 1st

Personal life
Þórir's daughter Maria Thorisdottir is a Norwegian international footballer. Þórir's brother is Grímur Hergeirsson, himself a handball coach and former player.

On 21 March 2017, Þórir was made a Knight 1st Class of the Royal Norwegian Order of Merit.

References

External links

1964 births
Living people
Thorir Hergeirsson
Handball coaches of international teams
Thorir Hergeirsson
Norwegian School of Sport Sciences alumni